Kellen's dormouse (Graphiurus kelleni) is a species of rodent in the family Gliridae. It is native to tropical Africa where its range extends from the Gambia and Senegal to Kenya and Tanzania. Its natural habitats are subtropical or tropical dry forests, and moist or dry savannah.

Description
The upper parts are grey, brown or tawny, the underparts are pale and the head has large ears and a dark mask surrounding the eyes.

Distribution and habitat
Kellen's dormouse is native to tropical western, central and eastern Africa south of the Sahara Desert. It is found in Angola, Benin, Burkina Faso, Cameroon,  Democratic Republic of the Congo, Ethiopia, Gambia, Ghana, Kenya, Malawi, Mali, Mozambique, Niger, Nigeria, Senegal, Somalia, South Sudan, Sudan, Tanzania, Togo, Uganda, Zambia and Zimbabwe. It occupies a range of habitats including dry forests and both moist and dry savannah.

Ecology
Kellen's dormouse is an active animal, scrambling about in trees and pouncing on its living prey, which includes insects and other invertebrates, small vertebrates, birds' eggs and carrion. Its diet also includes seeds and fruit. It is nocturnal and builds a nest into which it retreats during the day. Apart from briefly in the breeding season, it is a mostly solitary animal. It makes a number of shrill vocalisations, including both warning signals and communication signals, but little is known of its behaviour.

Status
Kellen's dormouse is a common species known from a range of habitat types. It has a very wide range and no specific threats have been identified, so the International Union for Conservation of Nature has rated its conservation status as being of "least concern".

References

Holden, M. E.. 2005. Family Gliridae. pp. 819–841 in Mammal Species of the World a Taxonomic and Geographic Reference. D. E. Wilson and D. M. Reeder eds. Johns Hopkins University Press, Baltimore.

Graphiurus
Mammals of Angola
Mammals described in 1890
Taxonomy articles created by Polbot